Association pour la défense de la Femme av droit, commonly known as Solidarité, was a women's organization in Switzerland, founded in 1872.   

The organization was founded by Marie Goegg-Pouchoulin after the dissolution of the Association Internationale des Femmes: Goegg-Pouchoulin served as chairperson of the Solidarité between 1875 and 1880. After a campaign initiated by Goegg-Pouchoulin the year of its foundation, women were given access to the University of Geneva. In 1880, the Solidarité was dissolved.

References 

1872 establishments in Switzerland
Feminism and history
Feminist organisations in Switzerland
Organizations established in 1872
Social history of Switzerland
Voter rights and suffrage organizations
Women's suffrage in Switzerland